William Burt Pope (19 February 1822–5 July 1903) was an English Wesleyan Methodist minister and theologian, who was president of the Methodist Conference.

Biography

Early life
William Burt Pope was born at Horton, Nova Scotia, on 19 February 1822. He was the younger son of John Pope (1791–1863), Wesleyan missionary and Catherine, born Uglow, who was originally of Stratton, Cornwall. He was the younger brother of George Uglow Pope. After education at a village school at Hooe and at a secondary school at Saltash, near Plymouth, William spent a year in boyhood (1837-8) at Bedeque, Prince Edward Island, assisting an uncle, a shipbuilder and general merchant.

In 1845, he married Ann Ehza Lethbridge, daughter of a yeoman farmer of Modbury, near Plymouth. By her he had six sons, two of whom died in early life, and four daughters.

Career
Pope was accepted, in 1840, by the Methodist synod of Cornwall as a candidate for the ministry, and entered the Methodist Theological Institution at Hoxton. Ordained in 1842, he began his active ministry at Kingsbridge, Devonshire. He served for short periods at Liskeard, Jersey, Sandhurst, Dover and Halifax. He served also for longer periods at City Road, London, Hull, Manchester, Leeds, and Southport.

In 1846, he became a successful linguist and translator of German anti-rationalist critics.

In 1860, he became editor, having as his co-editor (1883-6) James Harrison Rigg, of the London Quarterly Review''' to which he was already a contributor.

In 1867, he succeeded Dr. John Hannah the elder as tutor of systematic theology at Didsbury. He received the degree of D.D. from the Wesleyan University, U.S.A., in 1865 and from the University of Edinburgh in 1877. In 1876, he visited America with Dr. Rigg as delegate to the general conference of the methodist episcopal church at Baltimore.

In 1877, he was President of the Methodist Conference at Bristol.

From 1867 to 1886, he taught at Didsbury Wesleyan College in Manchester, England.

Theological contribution
Pope made notable contributions to theological literature which were deemed authoritative by his own church. His greatest work, a systematic theology, Compendium of Christian Theology'' (1875-1876), set forth influential arguments for the "holiness doctrine of all Methodist systematic theology" and defended Methodist doctrine against its critics. Wayne Grudem writes that, "This work […] is one of the greatest systematic theologies written from a Wesleyan or Arminian perspective." He had Arminian soteriological views.

Death
Pope died on 5 July 1903, and was buried in Abney Park Cemetery, London.

Works

Books as author

Books as translator

Chapters

Notes and references

Citations

Sources

Further reading

External links

1822 births
1903 deaths
19th-century British translators
19th-century English Christian theologians
19th-century Methodist ministers
Arminian ministers
Arminian theologians
English Methodist ministers
English translators
German–English translators
Linguists from England
Methodist theologians
People from Kings County, Nova Scotia
Presidents of the Methodist Conference
Systematic theologians